Edison Tech may refer to:
Edison Tech Center in Schenectady, New York
Edison Technical School in Rochester, New York
Seattle Central Community College, formerly known as Edison Technical School
Thomas A. Edison High School (Queens), formally known as Thomas A. Edison Career and Technical Education High School